Lee Boon Chye (born 26 September 1959) is a Malaysian politician who served as the Deputy Minister of Health in the Pakatan Harapan (PH) administration under former Prime Minister Mahathir Mohamad and former Minister Dzulkefly Ahmad from July 2018 to the collapse of the PH administration in February 2020 and the Member of Parliament (MP) for Gopeng from March 2008 to November 2022.   He is a member of the People's Justice Party (PKR), a component party of the PH  opposition coalition.

Background
Lee is a doctor and a certified cardiologist. He graduated from medical school in 1985 from the University of Malaya. He also holds 2 post graduate degree, a Master of Medicine from the University Kebangsaan Malaysia and Membership of the Royal Colleges of Physicians from UK.

Politics career
After losing in his debut in the 2004 general election (GE11), Lee was elected to Parliament in the 2008 general election (GE12), defeating Ling Hee Leong, son of former Malaysian Chinese Association (MCA) president, Ling Liong Sik to wrest the Gopeng seat away from the then governing Barisan Nasional (BN) coalition. He successfully retained the seat the subsequent 2013 (GE13) and 2018 (GE14) general elections.

After the GE14 which saw PH forming the new federal government, Lee had initially turned down the new seventh Prime Minister Mahathir Mohamad's offer to appoint him Deputy Health Minister. He however relented and accepted the post at last after much persuasions and considerations.

Election results

See also
 Gopeng (federal constituency)

References

Living people
1959 births
People from Johor
Malaysian politicians of Chinese descent
Malaysian people of Hakka descent
Malaysian cardiologists
People's Justice Party (Malaysia) politicians
Members of the Dewan Rakyat
21st-century Malaysian politicians